Batalha is a town and a municipality in Leiria District, Pinhal Litoral Subregion, Centro Region, Portugal. The town's name means "battle". The municipality is limited to the North and West by the municipality of Leiria, to the East by Ourém, to the Southeast by Alcanena and to the Southwest by Porto de Mós.

The town was founded by King D. João I of Portugal, jointly with the Monastery of Santa Maria da Vitória na Batalha, to pay homage to the Portuguese victory at the Battle of Aljubarrota (August 14, 1385) that put an end to the 1383–1385 Crisis.

History
Although there are countless traces throughout the region that allude to a human occupation since prehistoric times, passing through the Roman period and, successively, throughout history (it is believed that the Roman settlement of Collipo, originally of the Turduli people, established in São Sebastião do Freixo), Vila da Batalha owes its origin to the construction of the Santa Maria da Vitória Monastery. In fact, Batalha was born with the Avis Dynasty and the consolidation of Independence in 1385.

The administrative figure of the parishes is only drawn and defined throughout the second half of the 19th century, with Liberalism, so that on September 14, 1512, when the Prior-Major of Santa Cruz de Coimbra, D. Pedro Vaz Gavião, creates the parish of Batalha, it is evidently the seat that, however, delimits and is the first form of future civil parish.

Demography

Monuments 

Batalha Monastery
 Estátua Equestre de São Nuno de Santa Maria (1966 - 1968)
 Igreja Matriz de Exaltação de Santa Cruz (1514 - 1532)
 Capela da Santa Casa da Misericórdia (18th century)
 Ponte da Boutaca (1862)
 Pelourinho (Restored in 2000)
 Edifício Mouzinho de Albuquerque - Galeria de Exposições
 Capela de Nossa Senhora do Caminho
 Boca da Mina das Barrojeiras
 Igreja Paroquial Nossa Senhora dos Remédios
 Ermida de Nossa Senhora do Fetal
 Moinhos de Vento

Natural heritage 

 Grutas da Moeda
 Estremadura Limestone Massif
 Buraco Roto
 Pia da Ovelha
 Escarpa de falha do Reguengo do Fetal

Parishes
Administratively, the municipality is divided into 4 civil parishes (freguesias):
 Batalha
 Golpilheira
 Reguengo do Fetal
 São Mamede

International relations 
Batalha is twinned with:

  Trujillo, Spain (since 1992)
  Joinville-le-Pont, France (since 2008)

Notable people 
 Joaquim Augusto Mouzinho de Albuquerque (1855 in Batalha – 1902) a Portuguese cavalry officer.
 Moisés Espírito Santo Bagagem (born 1934 in Batalha) a Portuguese ethnologist and sociologist
 Olegário Benquerença (born 1969 in Batalha) a retired Portuguese football referee.

References

External links

 Photos from Batalha
Adrian Fletcher's Paradoxplace Batalha Pages (photos)
 Camara Municipal da Batalha
 Monastery of Batalha

Towns in Portugal
Populated places in Leiria District
Municipalities of Leiria District